Nikiforenko (Russian or Ukrainian: Никифоренко) is a gender-neutral Slavic surname that may refer to
Artūrs Ņikiforenko (born 1992), Latvian judoka
Syarhey Nikifarenka (born 1978), Belarusian football player

Belarusian-language surnames